Countess Ilona Andrássy de Csíkszentkirály et Krasznahorka (21 May 1858 – 2 April 1952) was a Hungarian noblewoman, wife of Count Lajos Batthyány de Németújvár (1860–1951) who served as Governor of Fiume.

Early life
Her parents were Count Gyula Andrássy and his wife Countess Katinka Kendeffy. She had three siblings including Tivadar and Gyula Jr.

External links
 Iván Nagy: Magyarország családai czimerekkel és nemzedékrendi táblákkal. I-XIII. Bp., 1857–1868
 

1858 births
1952 deaths
Hungarian nobility
Ilona
Children of prime ministers of Hungary